Mahmudabad (also Romanized as Maḩmūdābād and Mahmood Abad) is a village in Sarchehan Rural District, Sarchehan District, Bavanat County, Fars Province, Iran. At the 2006 census, its population was 388, in 107 families.

References 

Populated places in Sarchehan County